Suzanne Waughtel Hopper (née Bauer, 11 November, 19701 January 2011) was a Clark County, Ohio deputy killed on duty on New Year's Day of 2011, which led to the adoption of the Suzanne Hopper Act to improve officer safety when dealing with offenders who have a known history of mental illness.

Personal life
Suzanne Hopper was a 12-year veteran Deputy Sheriff with the Clark County Sheriff's Office (CCSO) and former Officer of the Year. She won multiple gold medals in Police Olympics weightlifting competitions. She was known for once going six years straight without a sick day. After her first daughter was born in 1992 with special needs, Hopper became involved in charity events for causes like the Special Olympics, for which she started a local volleyball fundraiser in 2008. She married her second husband, Matthew Hopper, in 2010. She had two children from her first marriage, Emily Bauer and Charles Waughtel, and two stepchildren, Madeleine and Cole Hopper. After Matthew Hopper died on 10 April 2014 at the age of 38 following a battle with cancer, the children were taken in by Suzanne Hopper's parents, Charles and Bonnie Bauer.

Shooting
On 1 January 2011, Deputy Hopper was responding to a call about shots being fired at the Enon Beach Campground with her partner Sergeant Dustin White. Around 11:35a.m., while her partner was interviewing the family whose trailer had been shot at, Hopper was shot at very close range while she was attempting to photograph a footprint. The gunman pointed a H&R 12-gauge break-action shotgun at her from inside his trailer and shot her with no warning. According to Clark County Sheriff Gene Kelly, Hopper "never had the opportunity to return fire or take cover".

A gun battle erupted between the suspect and other responding officers as they attempted to retrieve Hopper's body. According to an eyewitness, one officer attempted desperately to reach Hopper's body: he repeatedly asked over radio if he could get her but was denied because the scene was not secure. The police used a loudspeaker to ask the suspect to surrender himself for several minutes, before returning fire on his trailer and killing him.

A German Township officer, Jeremy Blum, was also wounded. He was flown to Miami Valley Hospital in stable condition. The proximity between the Enon Beach trailer park and Interstate 70 led to the highway being closed for about an hour.

Gunman
The gunman was identified as 57-year-old Michael Ferryman, who had a history of mental illness and violence. A girl living in the same trailer park described him as "a quiet person" who became unpleasant if angered. He was previously involved in another shootout with police in 2001, in Morgan County, for which he had been found not guilty due to insanity. He was released and supposed to be under supervision, but according to Clark County Sheriff Gene Kelly "the supervision failed" and there was no notification that Ferryman had moved to Clark County. Sheriff Kelly said if they had been aware of Ferryman's history, Hopper's response to the initial call would have been much more careful. Ferryman's girlfriend was sentenced to five years in prison after being convicted of giving Ferryman the gun used to kill Hopper.

Legacy
A funeral service was held on 7 January 2011, attended by thousands of officers from across the United States despite heavy snowfall. A 1,600-vehicle procession traversed Clark County. Hopper was posthumously awarded "deputy of the year".
During a speech given in May 2012 at the National Peace Officers Memorial Service, President Barack Obama honored Hopper's memory. Her name can be found among the 20,000 fellow fallen officers at the National Law Enforcement Officers Memorial in Washington D.C. A Springfield News-Sun photo of the event was later named in Life Magazine's "most memorable photos of the year". The video footage of the shootout was featured in the final episode of World's Wildest Police Videos.

A segment of Interstate 70 was renamed "Deputy Suzanne Hopper Memorial Highway".

Suzanne Hopper Act

The Suzanne Hopper Act is a law intended to create a database usable by law enforcement to track violent offenders ruled as mentally ill by Ohio courts.

In June 2013, the bill was sponsored by Republican state senators Chris Widener of Springfield and Bill Beagle of Tipp City, and was signed into law by governor John Kasich.

The law is credited with multiple instances of improving officer safety.

References

1970 births
2011 deaths
2011 in Ohio
American police officers killed in the line of duty
Deaths by person in Ohio
January 2011 events in the United States